Fading Memories aka Wiped-Out Footprints is a 1999 Spanish-Argentine drama film directed by  which stars Federico Luppi, Mercedes Sampietro, Elena Anaya, and Héctor Alterio.

Plot 
The plot concerns about the return to the Leonese village of Higueras of Manuel Perea (an emigrant to Argentina), seeking to rekindle with Virginia, her former love interest as well as widowed sister-in-law. Upon his arrival he meets the plight of desperation of the folks, as the construction of a new reservoir is going to drown the village for good.

Cast

Production 
The screenplay was penned by  alongside . The film is a Spanish-Argentine co-production by Trastorno Films, Alta Films, and Sinfonía Otoñal.

Release 
The film was presented at the 2nd Málaga Film Festival, screened in competition on 3 June 1999. It was theatrically released in Spain on 19 November 1999. It was theatrically released in Argentina in 17 February 2000.

Reception 
Horacio Bernades of Página/12 rated the film with 7 points, considering that "Luppi is impeccable", despite some issues with his accent.

Paraná Sendrós of Ámbito Financiero the film achieves its purpose of opening up some feelings in us ("with  honesty and in abundance)", to bring up some reflections.

Accolades 

|-
| rowspan = "3" align = "center" | 1999 || rowspan = "3" | 2nd Málaga Film Festival || colspan = "2" | Golden Biznaga ||  || rowspan = "3" | 
|-
| Best Director || Enrique Gabriel || 
|-
| Best Actress || Asunción Balaguer || 
|-
| align = "center" | 2001 || 49th Silver Condor Awards || Best Supporting Actor || Héctor Alterio ||  || 
|}

See also 
 List of Spanish films of 1999
 List of Argentine films of 2000

References 

Films shot in the province of Palencia
Films about immigration to Spain
Films set in Castile and León
1990s Spanish films
1999 drama films
Spanish drama films
Argentine drama films
1990s Spanish-language films
1990s Argentine films
Films about immigration to Argentina